Astrope is a village in Hertfordshire, England. It is in the civil parish of Tring Rural.

External links

Villages in Hertfordshire